An English cricket team captained by Lord Harris toured Australia and New Zealand in 1878–79 in a private tour organised by the Melbourne Cricket Club. The team's match against Australia in January 1879 was retrospectively given Test match status, making it the third Test ever and the third between Australia and England, though it was not part of The Ashes which began in 1882.

Harris' tour party arrived in Australia just two months after the touring Australians had returned from England. They were scheduled to play five tour matches, two each against New South Wales and Victoria and one against the combined Australians. Whilst in Sydney, the notorious Sydney Riot of 1879 occurred as a result of the tourists match against New South Wales. The English team, which is sometimes referred to as Lord Harris' XI, also visited New Zealand where they played a single match in Christchurch. From there, they travelled home via the Pacific and the US, stopping in Hoboken en route to play one further match there.

The touring team

 Lord Harris (c)
 Charlie Absolom
 Tom Emmett
 Leland Hone
 Alfred Hornby
 Alfred Lucas
 Francis MacKinnon
 Henry Maul
 Frank Penn
 Vernon Royle
 Sandford Schultz
 George Ulyett
 Alexander Webbe

Henry Maul (1850–1940), a batsman, played in eight of the minor matches on the tour, and later had a long career with Warwickshire in their pre-first-class days, but never played first-class cricket. Frank Penn, the only other tourist not to play in the Test, played in the one-off Test against Australia in 1880.

The Test teams

Matches

Only Test

Records

Individual records

Team records

Other records
Fred Spofforth (Aus) became the first player to ever take a hat-trick in Test cricket.

References

External links

1878 in Australian cricket
1878 in English cricket
1879 in American sports
1879 in Australian cricket
1879 in English cricket
1879 in New Zealand cricket
1878
1878
1879
1879
International cricket competitions from 1844 to 1888
New Zealand cricket seasons from 1863–64 to 1889–90
United States cricket in the 19th century
January 1879 events